Offenbach is an electoral constituency (German: Wahlkreis) represented in the Bundestag. It elects one member via first-past-the-post voting. Under the current constituency numbering system, it is designated as constituency 185. It is located in southern Hesse, comprising the city of Offenbach am Main and the western part of the Landkreis Offenbach district.

Offenbach was created for the inaugural 1949 federal election. Since 2017, it has been represented by Björn Simon of the Christian Democratic Union (CDU).

Geography
Offenbach is located in southern Hesse. As of the 2021 federal election, it comprises the independent city of Offenbach am Main and the municipalities of Dietzenbach, Dreieich, Egelsbach, Heusenstamm, Langen (Hessen), Mühlheim am Main, Neu-Isenburg, and Obertshausen from the Landkreis Offenbach district.

History
Offenbach was created in 1949, then known as Offenbach/M. It acquired its current name in the 1965 election. In the 1949 election, it was Hesse constituency 19 in the numbering system. From 1953 through 1976, it was number 144. From 1980 through 1998, it was number 142. In the 2002 and 2005 elections, it was number 186. Since the 2009 election, it has been number 185.

Originally, the constituency comprised the independent city of Offenbach am Main and the Landkreis Offenbach district. In the 1965 through 1972 elections, it comprised the city of Offenbach am Main and the entirety of the Landkreis Offenbach district excluding the municipalities of Dietzenbach, Dreieichenhain, Dudenhofen, Froschhausen, Götzenhain, Hainhausen, Hainstadt, Jügesheim, Klein-Auheim, Klein-Krotzenburg, Klein-Welzheim, Mainflingen, Offenthal, Rembrücken, Seligenstadt, Steinheim am Main, Weiskirchen, and Zellhausen. In the 1976 through 1998 elections, it acquired a configuration very similar to its current borders, but excluding the municipality of Dietzenbach from the Landkreis Offenbach district. It acquired its current borders in the 2002 election.

Members
The constituency was first represented by Harald Koch of the Social Democratic Party (SPD) from 1949 to 1953, followed by Wilhelm Banse of the SPD from 1953 to 1957. Karl Kanka won it for the Christian Democratic Union (CDU) in 1957. Horst Schmidt regained it for the SPD in 1961 and served three terms. Manfred Coppik succeeded him in 1972 and was representative until 1983. Klaus Lippold of the CDU then served from 1983 to 1998. Uta Zapf of the SPD was elected in 1998 and held the constituency for two terms, before former member Lippold regained it in 2005. He was succeeded by fellow CDU member Peter Wichtel in 2009, who served until 2017. Björn Simon was elected in 2017 and re-elected in 2021.

Election results

2021 election

2017 election

2013 election

2009 election

References

Federal electoral districts in Hesse
1949 establishments in West Germany
Constituencies established in 1949
Offenbach am Main
Offenbach (district)